Oliver S. Brown  (1849–1932) was a professional baseball player who played outfielder for the  and  Brooklyn Atlantics team of the NAPBBP.

References

External links

Brooklyn Atlantics (NABBP) players
Brooklyn Atlantics players
19th-century baseball players
1849 births
1932 deaths
Burials at Green-Wood Cemetery